The Prize for a Series is one of the prizes awarded by the Angoulême International Comics Festival. This prize was first awarded in 2004, then after two more years was cancelled. It was reinstated in 2010 and has been awarded ever since.

 2004: 20th Century Boys by Naoki Urasawa (Panini Comics/Génération Comics)
 Bételgeuse by Léo (Dargaud)
 Black Hole by Charles Burns (Delcourt)
  by François Boucq & Alejandro Jodorowsky (Les Humanoïdes Associés)
 Donjon by Joann Sfar & Lewis Trondheim (Delcourt)
 Sambre by Yslaire (Glénat)
 2005: Les Formidables Aventures de Lapinot by Lewis Trondheim (Dargaud)
 Buddy Longway by Derib (Le Lombard)
  by Jacques Tardi and Jean Vautrin (Casterman)
 Daredevil by Brian Michael Bendis and Alex Maleev (Marvel Comics)
 2006: Blacksad: Ame rouge by Juanjo Guarnido and Juan Diaz Canales (Dargaud)
 Black Hole: Bleu profond by Charles Burns (Delcourt)
 Bone: La couronne d’aiguilles by Jeff Smith (Delcourt)
 : La vengeance du manchot by François Boucq and Alexandro Jodorowsky (Les Humanoïdes Associés)
  part 3 by Frederik Peeters (Atrabile)
 Pascin: La java bleue by Joann Sfar (l’Association)
 Théodore Poussin: Les jalousies by Frank Le Gall (Dupuis)
 2012: Cité 14 by Pierre Gabus and Romuald Reutimann (Les Humanoïdes Associés)
 2013:  by Frederik Peeters (Gallimard)
 2015: Lastman, t.6 by Bastien Vivès, Balak, &  (KSTR/Casterman)
 2016: Miss Marvel by Adrian Alphona & G. Willow Wilson (Panini Comics)
 2017: Chiisakobee by Minetarō Mochizuki (Le Lézard noir)
 2018: Megg, Mogg & Owl by Simon Hanselmann (Misma)
 2019: Dansker by Halfdan Pisket (Presque lune)
 2020: Dans l'Abîme du temps by Gō Tanabe after H. P. Lovecraft (Ki-oon)
 2021: Paul à la maison by Michel Rabagliati
 2022: Spirou ou l'espoir malgré tout by Émile Bravo (Dupuis)

References

Angoulême International Comics Festival